Sue Vincent is a British actress and writer.

Career 
Vincent spent three years training in acting and musical theatre from 1991 to 1994 before first appearing on stage in 1996. Her first television role was as Anne Bevitt in Casualty. Since then, Vincent has become known for her roles in comedy series such as Shameless (2013), Mount Pleasant (2011–2017) and Bad Move, (2017–2018) is a British actress and writer.

She has also appeared in soap operas such as EastEnders, Coronation Street and Doctors and drama series such as The Amazing Mrs Pritchard, Monday Monday and Identity. As a writer, she has written alongside her Mount Pleasant co-star Sally Lindsay and as a member of The Comedy Project. She has also written numerous plays for Soho Theatre. In 2019, she appeared in the Mrs. Brown's Boys Christmas special as Peggy Piper.

In 2014, she was cast as Sadie in a stage production of the Jim Cartwright-penned play The Rise and Fall of Little Voice at the Derby Theatre in Derby and reprised the role in a 2019 production of the play opposite actor Ted Robbins at the Octagon Theatre in Bolton.

In January 2021, Vincent and writing partner Sally Lindsay were commissioned by Channel 5 and Acorn TV to write a 6-part television thriller series. The series, titled The Reluctant Madame Blanc,  will be directed by Dermot Boyd and Vincent will appear in the programme as an actress. Later known as The Madame Blanc Mysteries.

Filmography

References

External links

Living people
British television actresses
21st-century British actresses
Year of birth missing (living people)